Sunderland is a neighborhood in the northeast section of Portland, Oregon, United States. It is bordered by the Columbia River to the north; Woodlawn and Concordia to the south; Portland International Airport and Cully to the east; and East Columbia to the west. There is a city sanctioned transient encampment called Dignity Village in Sunderland between a state prison and the airport.

References

 
Neighborhoods in Portland, Oregon
Oregon populated places on the Columbia River